Martan Mann is an American jazz pianist and educator living in Boulder Creek, California. He performs with the Martan Mann Trio, the Martan Mann & Mannkind (contemporary jazz band) and has performed with George Young and Dmitri Matheny. A graduate of San Jose State University, San Francisco State University, Hawaii Pacific College, and the University of Hawaii, he is a musical director at Capitola Theater in Capitola, California and is on the board of directors for the Jazz Society of Santa Cruz, California. Jazz educational books include Jazz Improvisation for the Classical Pianist (1989), New Age Improvisation for the Classical Pianist (1994), and Improvising blues piano (1997). He is also the author of a jazz educational DVD, Jazz Skills for Piano.

References

External links
 Official site
 YouTube

American jazz pianists
American male pianists
American jazz educators
Living people
San Jose State University alumni
San Francisco State University alumni
Hawaii Pacific University alumni
University of Hawaiʻi at Mānoa alumni
People from Boulder Creek, California
21st-century American pianists
21st-century American male musicians
American male jazz musicians
Year of birth missing (living people)
Jazz musicians from California